Sunnyside is a Canadian sketch comedy television series, which premiered January 9, 2015 on City. Created by Dan Redican and Gary Pearson, the series is set in the fictional neighbourhood of Sunnyside and features sketches depicting various eccentric recurring characters living there.  The show was cancelled after one season, although City has sometimes reaired the episodes in repeats.

The cast includes Pat Thornton, Patrice Goodman, Alice Moran, Kevin Vidal, Kathleen Phillips, Rob Norman and Norm Macdonald. The show was filmed in Winnipeg, Manitoba.

Redican and Pearson had each approached Rogers Communications with individual show ideas; Redican's pitch was Our Street, an ensemble series about the quirky residents of an urban neighbourhood, while Pearson's was Dark Roast, about the quirky customers of a coffee shop. Neither pitch was accepted as presented, but Rogers asked them to combine their ideas into a single show. They agreed and created Sunnyside, patterning their fictional neighbourhood after Toronto's Parkdale.

Macdonald appears on the show only in voice form, as the neighbourhood's surreal alternate reality version of the Internet: a sentient sewer line which can answer search queries shouted into a manhole.

Episodes

Season 1 (2015)

Reception
Television critics reviewed the show favourably, with Brad Oswald of the Winnipeg Free Press calling it "Canada's best sketch-comedy TV effort since Codco and The Kids in the Hall arrived in rapid succession in the late '80s", and John Doyle of The Globe and Mail calling the show "daft but deftly skewering the ripe pickings of contemporary ludicrousness". Doyle also criticized the network for scheduling the show to air directly opposite The Big Bang Theory, stating that the show "deserves a much bigger potential audience than that offered in this suicide-slot."

The cast collectively won the Canadian Screen Award for Best Performance in a Variety or Sketch Comedy Program or Series at the 4th Canadian Screen Awards in 2016.

References

External links

 
 

2015 Canadian television series debuts
2015 Canadian television series endings
2010s Canadian sketch comedy television series
Citytv original programming
Television shows filmed in Winnipeg